Lindsey County Council was the county council of Lindsey, one of the three Parts of Lincolnshire in eastern England. It came into its powers on 1 April 1889 and was abolished on 1 April 1974. The county council was initially based at the County Hall, Lincoln Castle and then, from 1932, based at the County Offices in Lincoln. It was amalgamated with Holland County Council and Kesteven County Council to form the new Lincolnshire County Council in 1974.

References

Former county councils of England
Local authorities in Lincolnshire
Local education authorities in England